Swadesh Deepak (born 1943) is an Indian playwright, novelist and short-story writer. Deepak has been active on the Hindi literary scene since the mid-1960s and is best known for Court Martial, a 1991 play. Deepak's most recent book is Maine Mandu Nahin Dekha, a volume of memoirs. 

Deepak holds master's degrees in both Hindi and English. For twenty-six years, he taught English literature at Ambala's Gandhi Memorial College.

Awards and honours

Deepak won the Sangeet Natak Akademi Award in 2004.

Books

Collections of short stories

 Ashwarohi / अश्वारोही (1973)
 Maatam / मातम (1978)
 Tamaasha / तमाशा (1979)
 Pratinidhi Kahaniyan / प्रतिनिधि कहानियां (1985)
 Bal Bhagwaan / बाल भगवान (1986)
 Kisi Apriya Ghatna Ka Samachar Nahin / किसी अप्रिय घटना का समाचार नहीं (1990)
 Maskhare Kabhi Nahin Rote / मसखरे कभी नहीं रोते (1997)
 Nirvachit Kahaniyan / निर्वाचित कहानियां (2003)
 Bagugoshe /  बगूगोशे (2017)

Novels

 Number 57 Squadron / नंबर ५७ स्क्वाड्रन (1973)
 Mayapot / मायापोत (1985)'

Plays

 Natak Bal Bhagwan / नाटक बाल भगवान (1989) Court Martial / कोर्ट मार्शल (1991) Jalta Hua Rath / जलता हुआ रथ (1998) Sabse Udaas Kavita / सबसे उदास कविता (1998) Kaal Kothari / काल कोठरी (1999)Memoirs

 Maine Mandu Nahin Dekha / मैंने मांडू नहीं देखा (2003)''

References

External links
 Translation of a Short Story by Swadesh Deepak (from The Little Magazine)
 Media Feature on Swadesh Deepak
 Swadesh Deepak, sir, a poem by Samartha Vashishtha
 Synopsis and Reviews of Court Martial
 News about Swadesh Deepak Court Martial
 Court Martial at FTII, by Swatantra Theatre PUNE
 http://amitspecial.blogspot.in/2013/03/where-is-swadesh-deepak.html

1943 births
2000s missing person cases
Indian male novelists
Indian male dramatists and playwrights
Indian memoirists
People from Ambala
Hindi-language writers
People with bipolar disorder
Hindi dramatists and playwrights
Dramatists and playwrights from Haryana
20th-century Indian novelists
20th-century Indian dramatists and playwrights
Novelists from Haryana
20th-century Indian male writers
Missing person cases in India
Recipients of the Sangeet Natak Akademi Award